Walery Rzewuski (14 April 1837, in Kraków – 18 November 1888, in Kraków) was a Polish photographer, social activist and an alderman in Kraków.

Rzewuski is considered to be one of Poland's most important 19th-century photographers. He was the author of many portraits of cultural figures, scientists, nobles, entrepreneurs and members of government.

The State Museum of the History of Photography in Kraków is named after Rzewuski .

References

External links 

 Rzewuski photographs in Europeana
 Photo Consortium on the Walery Rzewuski Museum
 Works by Walery Rzewuski in digital library Polona

1837 births
1888 deaths
Walery
Photographers from Kraków
Portrait photographers
Pioneers of photography
19th-century Polish artists
19th-century Polish politicians
Polish Roman Catholics